Theodor Dumitru Stolojan (born 24 October 1943) is a Romanian politician who was Prime Minister of Romania from September 1991 to November 1992. An economist by training, he was also one of the presidents of the National Liberal Party (PNL) before being the founding leader of the Liberal Democratic Party (PLD) and then the Democratic Liberal Party (PDL). He was a Member of the European Parliament for Romania, representing the Democratic Liberal Party (PDL) and then the National Liberal Party (PNL; both EPP-ED-affiliated).

Career
Before the Romanian Revolution he worked at the Committee for State Planning, together with Nicolae Văcăroiu, who was President of the Senate between 20 December 2000 and 14 October 2008.

During the rule of Nicolae Ceauşescu he worked at the Ministry of Finances between 1972 and 1977 as an economist in the State Budget Department, then between 1978 and 1982 as Chief of Accountancy of State Budget and then as deputy director of the Department for Foreign Exchange and International Financial Relations until the Romanian Revolution.

He was the Prime minister of Romania from September 1991 to November 1992, then worked for the World Bank and for a Romanian private company. In 1992, the Stolojan government began an austerity plan, limiting wages and further liberalising prices. The economic situation deteriorated and inflation as well as unemployment increased substantially.

In 2000, he re-entered politics as a member of the National Liberal Party (PNL); he ran for the presidency of Romania in the November 2000 elections, but came in third, behind Ion Iliescu and Corneliu Vadim Tudor. He was named president of the PNL in August 2002.

In 2003, his party approached the Democratic Party leader Traian Băsescu, at that time the mayor of Bucharest, and initiated an alliance named "D.A. - Dreptate şi Adevăr" (Justice and Truth Alliance).  In February 2004, he was chosen as the alliance's candidate in the Romanian presidential election of November 2004.

On 2 October 2004, Stolojan surprisingly stepped down from the leadership of the PNL and also withdrew from the presidential race.  He cited serious health problems as a reason for his decision. Stolojan became a senior advisor to Băsescu after the latter was inaugurated as president on 20 December 2004.

On 10 October 2006, Stolojan was expelled from the PNL, and in December he formed a new party, the Liberal Democrats (PLD), whose president he was elected at the first PLD congress on 31 March 2007. In January 2008, the PLD merged with the Democratic Party to form the Democratic Liberal Party (PDL), of which Stolojan was then a member.

The PDL won the most seats in the 2008 election, and on 10 December 2008, Stolojan was designated prime minister of Romania by President Traian Băsescu. Five days later, he withdrew his acceptance, saying he was stepping down in favour of a younger candidate; Emil Boc was then selected.

Personal life
He and his wife Elena have a son, Vlad Stolojan, and a daughter, Ada Palea.

Electoral history

Presidential elections

References 

|-

|-

|-

1943 births
Bucharest Academy of Economic Studies alumni
Candidates for President of Romania
Chairpersons of the National Liberal Party (Romania)
Democratic Liberal Party (Romania) MEPs
Living people
MEPs for Romania 2007–2009
MEPs for Romania 2009–2014
People from Târgoviște
Prime Ministers of Romania
Romanian economists
Romanian Ministers of Finance
Members of the Romanian Orthodox Church
Romanian presidential advisors
MEPs for Romania 2014–2019
National Salvation Front (Romania) politicians
Romanian Communist Party politicians